Saucillo is a city in the Mexican state of Chihuahua.
It serves as the municipal seat of the surrounding municipality of  Saucillo. 

As of 2010, the city of Saucillo had a population of 11,004, up from 9,261 as of 2005.

See also
San Bernardino, Chihuahua

References

Populated places in Chihuahua (state)